Malibu Mar Vista is a former settlement in the Malibu area of western Los Angeles County, California.

It lay at an elevation of 1831 feet (558 m) in the Santa Monica Mountains.

Malibu Mar Vista still appeared on USGS maps as of 1932.

References

Former settlements in Los Angeles County, California
Malibu, California
Populated places in the Santa Monica Mountains
Former populated places in California